Joseph Sasto III is an American chef and television figure. He has appeared as a competitor on reality television cooking competitions, and he is a Top Chef television series alum. He also teaches cooking classes online. Sasto has a handlebar mustache, which inspired the nickname "Mustache Joe". Sasto has been based in San Francisco and Los Angeles.

Biography 
Sasto attended University of California, Davis (UC Davis) and graduated with a B.A. degree (2010) in communications. 

After graduation he was a line chef in a newly opened restaurant in Ukiah, California. He moved to San Francisco to work for two years at RN74 under chef Jason Berthold, where he moved up to the role of sous-chef. Followed by three years working at Cotogna restaurant (and sometimes at sister restaurant Quince) in San Francisco, under chef Michael Tusk. Followed by a role as executive sous chef at Lazy Bear restaurant in San Francisco. In 2018, he worked as an executive chef at the former Cal Mare restaurant in Los Angeles. While working at Cal Mare, Sasto was one of the contestants on the American television series Top Chef: Colorado.

Filmography 
 2018, Home & Family, as self
 2016–2022, Chopped, as self both as contestant and as judge
 2017, Top Chef: Colorado, as self
 2020, Top Chef: All-Stars L.A., as self
 2022–2023, Tournament of Champions, as self

References

External links 
 Official website
 

Date of birth missing (living people)
Living people
University of California, Davis alumni
American chefs
Chefs from San Francisco
Chefs from Los Angeles
Top Chef contestants
American television chefs
American male chefs